Peduru Hewage William de Silva (8 December 1908 – 30 July 1988) was a 20th-century Marxist/Trotskyist Sri Lankan politician.

P. H. William de Silva was born at Kahatapitiya in Batapola, Ambalangoda, Ceylon, to a wealthy land-owning family. He received his elementary education at Batapola Mixed School and secondary education at St John's College, Panadura, Richmond College, Galle, and Ananda College, Colombo. He studied for one year at the University College Colombo (now the University of Colombo) and then travelled to England for further studies at University College, Oxford.

While in England, William de Silva joined the India League and a Marxist study group with other Ceylonese students in London. He then returned to Ceylon and joined the Lanka Sama Samaja Party (LSSP). During World War II, he was an anti-war movement leader and was imprisoned in Bogambara Prison and Badulla Prison in Sri Lanka (1943–45). He became a Ceylonese Member of Parliament in 1947 and 1953. He was leader of the All-Ceylon Estate Workers Union and Vice-President of the All-Ceylon Congress of Samasamaja Youth Leagues. He separated from the LSSP in October 1953 and joined the Viplavakari Lanka Sama Samaja Party (VLLSP). He was the founding leader of Mahajana Eksath Peramuna. He was Cabinet Minister of Industries and Fisheries in S. W. R. D. Bandaranaike's SLFP-MEP coalition government (1956–59). He became a member of parliament in 1960 and was Vice-President of the Sri Lanka Freedom Party. In 1970, he became the Ceylon High Commissioner to Canada.

De Silva died aged 79.

See also 
 List of Sri Lankan non-career diplomats
 List of Sri Lankan independence activists
 List of University of Oxford people in public life overseas
 List of alumni of University College, Oxford

References 

1908 births
1988 deaths
Alumni of the Ceylon University College
Alumni of Richmond College, Galle
Alumni of University College, Oxford
Fisheries ministers of Sri Lanka
High Commissioners of Sri Lanka to Canada
Industries ministers of Sri Lanka
Lanka Sama Samaja Party politicians
Members of the 1st Parliament of Ceylon
Members of the 2nd Parliament of Ceylon
Members of the 3rd Parliament of Ceylon
Members of the 4th Parliament of Ceylon
Members of the 6th Parliament of Ceylon
People from British Ceylon
Prisoners and detainees of British Ceylon
Sinhalese politicians
Sinhalese trade unionists
Sri Lankan independence activists
Sri Lankan prisoners and detainees